Sredno Konjari is a village in the municipality of Petrovec, North Macedonia.

Demographics
As of the 2021 census, Sredno Konjari had 1,211 residents with the following ethnic composition:
Albanians 608
Bosniaks 462
Turks 89
Persons for whom data are taken from administrative sources 41
Macedonians 7
Others 4

According to the 2002 census, the village had a total of 1140 inhabitants. Ethnic groups in the village include:
Albanians 667
Bosniaks 402
Turks 61 
Others 9

References

External links

Villages in Petrovec Municipality
Albanian communities in North Macedonia